At the time of its shutdown in December 2020, Montenegro Airlines served the following scheduled destinations: There were only 18.

List

References

Lists of airline destinations